Vanessa Angel (21 December 1993 – 4 November 2021), born Vanesza Adzania, was an Indonesian actress, model and singer. She primarily acted in FTV (television films).

Biography
Vanessa  was born Vanesza Adzania on 21 December 1993 in Jakarta, Indonesia, the eldest of four daughters. She was raised by her paternal grandparents and began her career as a model in teen magazines. In 2008, she played Sandra in Cinta Intan before appearing on MBA: Married By Accident opposite Nikita Willy and Marcell Darwin. In 2011, she sang with and appeared in the music video alongside Nicky Tirta for the song "Indah Cintaku."

Vanessa was arrested in Surabaya on 6 January 2019 and was sentenced to 5 months in prison for prostitution-related charges after authorities found she had exchanged electronic documents containing "inappropriate materials" for money. In 2020, she and her husband were arrested in East Jakarta for possession of psychotropic drugs prescribed to her by an unlicensed doctor. Vanessa spent 3 months in prison.

Personal life and death 
Vanessa married Febri "Bibi" Ardiansyah on 11 January 2020. She announced the birth of their son via Instagram in July 2020.

Vanessa and her husband were both killed in a car accident on the Nganjuk-Surabaya Toll Road in Jombang on 4 November 2021. Vanessa had reportedly been asleep in the backseat not wearing a seatbelt when the crash occurred. Siska Lorensa, the family's nanny, sustained serious injuries while the driver, Tubagus Joddy, and Vanessa's son suffered minor injuries. Vanessa and Ardiansyah were buried at TPU Malaka, a cemetery in South Jakarta.

Filmography

References

1993 births
2021 deaths
Indonesian child actresses
21st-century Indonesian actresses
Actresses from Jakarta
Road incident deaths in Indonesia